South Washington is an unincorporated community in Washington Township, Daviess County, Indiana.

History
South Washington was laid out in 1874 as a mining town. It is south of Washington, hence the name.
It  was also known as "Lick Skillet" by its French population who were miners.

Geography

References

External links

Unincorporated communities in Daviess County, Indiana
Unincorporated communities in Indiana
1874 establishments in Indiana
Populated places established in 1874